Interstate 587 (I-587) is a  auxiliary Interstate Highway in the US state of North Carolina. The western terminus of the highway is at I-95, I-795, and US Highway 264 (US 264) near Wilson. The highway runs concurrently with I-795 and US 264 around the southern side of Wilson. The eastern end of the US 264 overlap is located northwest of Saratoga. I-587 continues travelling east, bypassing Saratoga and Farmville to the north. The eastern terminus of I-587 is located at US 264 and North Carolina Highway 11 Bypass (NC 11 Byp) in western Greenville. I-587 is a spur of the North Carolina segment of I-87 which runs from Raleigh to Wendell. , I-587 does not connect with its parent route. 

On establishment of the North Carolina Highway System, the primary route between Wilson and Greenville was NC 91. US 264 was signed along the route in 1932 and NC 91 was decommissioned. Over the years, US 264 was improved and in 1992, a freeway was completed between I-95 in Wilson and Greenville. In January 2013, the mayors of Greenville, Ayden, and Kinston began a political push for an Interstate designation between Greenville and I-95. On November 14, 2016, the American Association of State Highway and Transportation Officials (AASHTO) designated the highway as the Future I-587 corridor. On May 10, 2021, the highway was officially established from I-95 in Wilson to US 264/NC 11 Byp. in Greenville and was signed in June 2022. In the future, I-587 will extend west to I-87 and US 64 in Zebulon.

Route description
I-587 begins at an interchange between I-95 and I-795 and US 264 southwest of Wilson. US 264 extends west to Raleigh, while the interchange marks the northern terminus of I-795. I-587, I-795, and US 264 travel east around southern Wilson. At the interchange, I-795 turns south toward Goldsboro. Immediately following the I-795 interchange, I-587 and US 264 interchange with US 301 which provides access to the northern terminus of US 117. I-587 and US 264 continue east, looping around Wilson. The highways intersect NC 58 southeast of Wilson, which is followed by an S-curve in the freeway.

An interchange with US 264 and US 264 Alternate follows the S-curve, marking the eastern end of the US 264 concurrency. I-587 continues east around the town of Saratoga. As it loops around Saratoga, I-587 is repositioned to the southeast, largely paralleling US 264. I-587 begins an easterly turn north of Walstonburg and interchanges with NC 91 and US 264, before completing the curve west of Farmville. As I-587 continues north around Farmville, it meets US 258 and US 258 Business (US 258 Bus.) at an interchange northwest of downtown. US 258 follows I-587 to the east for  before leaving the freeway at another interchange east of downtown Farmville. I-587 continues for another  through rural North Carolina before intersecting US 264 and NC 11 Byp. west of Greenville. The interchange marks the eastern terminus of I-587.

The North Carolina Department of Transportation (NCDOT) measures average daily traffic volumes along many of the roadways it maintains. In 2016, average daily traffic volumes along I-587 varied from 18,000 vehicles per day west of exit 63 in Pitt County to 34,000 vehicles per day west of exit 43C in Wilson County. I-587 is included with the National Highway System, a network of highways in the US which serve strategic transportation facilities in its entirety.

History

In January 2013, the mayors of Greenville, Kinston, and Ayden announced that they would push to change the designation of US 264 between Wilson and Greenville to an Interstate.

On September 7, 2016, Governor Pat McCrory said he would ask for the section of US 264 between Zebulon and Greenville to be designated an Interstate Highway. The justification for Interstate status was that Greenville was the 10th largest city in the state and had no Interstate connecting it.  On November 14, AASHTO approved the Future I-587 designation; followed by Federal Highway Administration (FHWA) approval on November 21. In April 2017, NCDOT began posting Future I-587 signs along the length of the route. On May 10, 2021, AASHTO approved the establishment of I-587, between I-95 and Greenville. This was further approved on November 16, 2021, marking the designation official. Signage for the designation went up on June 20, 2022.

Future
NCDOT intends to extend I-587 west along US 264 from its current western terminus in Wilson to US 64 and US 264 in Zebulon. In addition, the department expects to extend the designation of I-87 northward from its current terminus in Wendell along US 64 toward Norfolk, Virginia. This would provide a connection between I-587 and its parent route. Currently, though, NCDOT does not have a timetable to upgrade US 264 between Zebulon and Wilson to Interstate standards.

Exit list

References

External links

 

87-5 North Carolina
87-5
5 North Carolina
Transportation in Wilson County, North Carolina
Transportation in Greene County, North Carolina
Transportation in Pitt County, North Carolina